Aslı Biçen is a Turkish novelist and translator.

Biography
Born in 1970 in Bursa, Biçen graduated from the Department of English Language and Literature at Boğaziçi University. She is a founding member of the Turkish Association of Literary Translators (ÇEVBIR). Since 1990, she has translated over 50 titles, including those of Charles Dickens, William Faulkner, Ursula K. Le Guin, Anne Carson, and Salman Rushdie, into Turkish. She has also translated the English-language novels of Turkish writer Elif Shafak into Turkish. In 2006, Biçen, Shafak, and Hüseyin Semih Sökmen, the publishing executive, were prosecuted for the publication and translation of Shafak's novel, The Bastard of Istanbul, on the charges of "denigrating Turkishness" per Article 301 of the Turkish Penal Code. The Beyoğlu Court of Justice dismissed the charges for a lack of evidence. 

As an author, Biçen has published three novels in Turkish: Elime Tutun (Hold My Hand) (2005), İnceldiği Yerden (Snapping Point) (2008), and Tehdit Mektupları (Threat Letters) (2011). In 2021, Istros Books published her novel İnceldiği Yerden as Snapping Point, translated by Feyza Howell.

Selected works

Translator

Author

References

Living people
Turkish–English translators
20th-century Turkish women writers
20th-century Turkish writers
21st-century Turkish women writers
Turkish women novelists
People from Bursa
1970 births